Acrapex metaphaea is a species of moth of the family Noctuidae first described by George Hampson in 1910. It is found in Africa, including Zimbabwe and South Africa.

The wingspan is about 26 mm.

Description
Head and thorax ochreous tinged with rufous and mixed with some black brown; palpi dark brown; abdomen dorsally dark brown, ventrally ochreous tinged with rufous. Forewing rufous, the costal area, median nervure and veins arising from it, and inner margin suffused with dark brown, slight white points in and beyond lower angle of cell; traces of a subterminal series of black points, a slight oblique dark shade from termen below apex; a terminal series of black points. Hindwing dark reddish brown, the cilia with fine pale line at base; the underside greyish suffused and sprinkled with fuscous.

References

External links

Xyleninae
Lepidoptera of Zimbabwe
Moths of Sub-Saharan Africa
Lepidoptera of South Africa